Three Sons o' Guns is a 1941 American comedy film directed by Benjamin Stoloff, written by Fred Niblo, Jr., and starring Wayne Morris, Marjorie Rambeau, Irene Rich, Tom Brown, William T. Orr, Susan Peters and Moroni Olsen. It was released by Warner Bros. on August 2, 1941.

Plot
Margaret Patterson was left a widow when her three sons were young and struggled a lot to bring them up with limited income. The three sons grow up to be selfish, irresponsible and can hardly keep a job. Now they are being drafted into the army and each one of them comes up with an excuse for not being drafted.

Cast 
   
Wayne Morris as Charley Patterson
Marjorie Rambeau as Aunt Lottie
Irene Rich as Margaret Patterson
Tom Brown as Eddie Patterson
William T. Orr as Kenneth Patterson
Susan Peters as Mary Tyler
Moroni Olsen as Philip Talbot
Barbara Pepper as Francie
John Kelly as Buffalo Bill Oxenstern
Fritz Feld as Blotievkin
Charles Waldron as Henry Gresham 
Charles Halton as Haddock
Florence Shirley as Mrs. Tyler
William B. Davidson as Baxter
Frank M. Thomas as Reynolds
Emory Parnell as Delivery Man

References

External links 
 

1941 films
Warner Bros. films
American comedy films
1941 comedy films
Films directed by Benjamin Stoloff
American black-and-white films
1940s English-language films
1940s American films